Finsland Church is a parish church of the Church of Norway in Kristiansand Municipality in Agder county, Norway. It is located in the village of Finsland. It is the church for the Finsland parish which is part of the Kristiansand domprosti (arch-deanery) in the Diocese of Agder og Telemark. The white, wooden church was built in a cruciform design in 1803 using plans drawn up by an unknown architect. The church seats about 250 people.

History
The earliest existing historical records of the church date back to the year 1620, but the church was likely old at that time. The church was first built during the Middle ages. In 1749, the old church was torn down and a new church was completed in 1751. The new church was built a little south of the old church site. Unfortunately, the new location was not good due to unstable soil, and after about 50 years, the church was torn down in 1803. After doing quite a bit of site preparation and leveling of the ground, a new church was built a little to the west of the previous church site. The new church was completed in 1803, but it was not consecrated until 1812.

See also
List of churches in Agder og Telemark

References

Churches in Kristiansand
Wooden churches in Norway
Cruciform churches in Norway
19th-century Church of Norway church buildings
Churches completed in 1808